Hugo Heermann (3 March 1844, in Heilbronn – 6 November 1935, in Meran, Italy) was a German violinist. He studied the violin with Lambert Joseph Meerts at the Koninklijk Conservatorium in Brussels, and later with Joseph Joachim. From 1864 he lived in Frankfurt am Main, where he taught violin from 1878 to 1904 at the Hoch Conservatory. He played 1st violin with Hugo Becker, Fritz Bassermann and Adolf Rebner in the "Museums-Quartett" (also called the "Heermann-Quartett" and "Frankfurter Quartett"). Between 1906 and 1909 he taught at the Chicago Musical College, in 1911 at the Stern Conservatory in Berlin and 1912 at the Conservatoire de musique in Geneva. In 1909 and 1910 he briefly was a member of The Dutch Trio, which transposed into the Heermann-van Lier String Quartet. He served as concertmaster of the Cincinnati Symphony Orchestra for a period beginning in 1909; he was succeeded in that post by his son Emil. He has the distinction of having been the first to have played Brahms' Violin Concerto in Paris, New York City and Australia. After his retirement in 1922 he lived mostly in Meran, Italy.

References

Publications 
 Charles Auguste de Bériots École transcendentale du violon. Hugo Heermann, Ed., 1896.
 Heermann, Hugo: Meine Lebenserinnerungen. Leipzig: 1935

Literature 
 Cahn, Peter. Das Hoch'sche Konservatorium in Frankfurt am Main (1878–1978), Frankfurt am Main: Kramer, 1979.
 Baker's Biographical Dictionary of Musicians, (Nicolas Slonimsky, Ed.) New York: G. Schirmer, 1958.

German classical violinists
Male classical violinists
German male violinists
German music educators
Concertmasters
1844 births
1935 deaths
19th-century classical violinists
19th-century German musicians
20th-century classical violinists
20th-century German male musicians
19th-century German male musicians
20th-century German musicians